Alden is a lunar impact crater that lies on the far side of the Moon, between Hilbert to the north-northwest and Milne to the south-southeast. To the south-southwest lies Scaliger.

Alden has a low rim that is overlain in the north and northeast by Alden C and the smaller Alden E. The rim is worn and eroded, especially along the southern wall. The floor is somewhat irregular and pitted. The small crater Alden V lies just inside the north rim, and is attached to Alden C to the east.

Satellite craters
By convention these features are identified on lunar maps by placing the letter on the side of the crater midpoint that is closest to Alden.

References

External links 
 

Impact craters on the Moon